BBC Motion Gallery is the footage licensing division of BBC Studios. It offers creative professionals access to a collection of  stock footage with licensing worldwide.

History
The organization originated in London as BBC Library Sales, a division of BBC Worldwide, in 1961. It opened an office in New York in 1993, and in 1994 opened offices in Toronto and Los Angeles. BBC Motion Gallery with 2004 has since opened additional offices in Hong Kong, Sydney, Mumbai, Tokyo and Paris. In January 2014 began a strategic partnership with Getty Images.

Functions
BBC Motion Gallery footage encompasses subjects including natural history, sport, news, locations, art, music, celebrities and historic events. Clips from the archive have appeared in several films, usually of a historical nature.

Users are able to access over 125,000 BBC Motion Gallery clips online, or enlist a team of professional researchers to tap into the repository of content stored offline.

In addition to the BBC archive of rights-managed footage, BBC Motion Gallery offers a wide range of high-quality, royalty-free motion clips.

Website
The BBC Motion Gallery collection includes over 125,000 creative, editorial and archival clips, along with millions of hours of offline content. The premium content spans a wide range of subjects including news, sport, natural history, wildlife, locations, celebrities, history, culture, science and stock. Online clips are available to download in broadcast quality from the website 24/7, while rare and unique offline content can be accessed using the online BBC Broadcast Archive research tool or with assistance from the experienced team.

Representations  
BBC Motion Gallery is the exclusive global representative of the Scottish Professional Football League.

Short programmes 
In addition to footage licensing, BBC Motion Gallery produces and distributes short-form programmes for broadcast on television and across all new media platforms.

BBC Archive 

The BBC Archive is a searchable, online database which catalogues over a million hours of BBC content dating back 60 years. BBC Archive includes detailed text descriptions of news items, television programmes and rare clips.

Users can access BBC Archive via http://www.gettyimages.co.uk/footage/bbcmotiongallery. All content is stored as text entries.

BBC Studios 
BBC Studios is the main commercial arm and a wholly owned subsidiary of the British Broadcasting Corporation (BBC). The company exists to maximize the value of the BBC's assets for the benefit of the licence payer and invest in public service programming in return for rights. The company has seven core businesses: Channels, TV Sales, Magazines, Content & Production, Home Entertainment, Global Brands and Digital Media.

See also
 BFI National Archive

References

External links
 BBC Motion Gallery
 Launch of BBC Motion Gallery in June 2004
 Interview of Chris Hulse Head of Motion Gallery in FOCAL International Archive Zones Winter 2014

Film archives in the United Kingdom
Online archives of the United Kingdom
BBC offices, studios and buildings
CBS News
NHK
China Central Television
Television organisations in the United Kingdom
British companies established in 2004
1961 establishments in the United Kingdom
Mass media companies established in 2004
Television archives in the United Kingdom